Laura Pergolizzi (born March 18, 1981), known professionally as LP, is an American singer and songwriter. LP has released six albums and three EPs. LP has written songs for other artists including Cher, Rihanna, the Backstreet Boys, Leona Lewis, Mylène Farmer, Céline Dion and Christina Aguilera.

Early life
Pergolizzi was born in 1981 on Long Island, to an Italian father and mother, her paternal grandfather coming from Palermo and grandmother from Naples, Italy. Pergolizzi adopted the stage name "LP" after moving to New York City.

Career
David Lowery of the band Cracker saw LP performing and featured her on "Cinderella", a hidden track on the band's 1998 album, Gentleman's Blues, which featured LP's backing vocals on two other tracks. Lowery followed up by producing LP's debut album Heart-Shaped Scar, released in 2001 through Koch Records. LP's second album, Suburban Sprawl & Alcohol, was released in June 2004 through Lightswitch Records. On the record, she collaborated with songwriter and music producer Linda Perry. However, in spite of extensive touring to promote the release and positive reviews from music critics, the album failed to gain widespread recognition.

2006–2010
In 2006, LP appeared at the music conference South by Southwest and reportedly sparked a bidding war amongst major music labels, eventually being signed by L.A. Reid to his The Island Def Jam Music Group record label, part of the Universal Music Group. However, due to artistic differences, LP left the contract. She signed with SoBe Entertainment in 2007, an independent record label, with the album tracks they have written at the major label. "Love Will Keep You Up All Night", one of the tracks they had written at The Island Def Jam Music Group with Billy Mann, was released in late 2007 on the Backstreet Boys album, Unbreakable. LP wrote and performed "Wasted", from the album Suburban Sprawl & Alcohol. "Wasted" was used as the theme song for the TV series South of Nowhere, which aired on Noggin's teen block, The N. MTV's The Hills also featured LP's song "Damage Is Done" in mid-2010, and it was released on iTunes.

During 2009, LP started writing songs for other artists, including several songs which ended up on Heidi Montag's album, Superficial released by Warner Music Group. LP co-wrote the single, "More Is More", as well as the album tracks, "Twisted", "Hey Boy" and "Love It or Leave It". She also co-wrote other tracks for and with Montag, such as the Cathy Dennis co-written, "Look How I'm Doin'", "I Do This" and "Who's That Girl". A song LP wrote with Alexander Kronlund, "Standing Where You Left Me", was released on Erik Hassle's debut UK album, Pieces released by Island Records and Republic Records. LP moved to Los Angeles in 2010.

2011–2012
In August 2010, it was announced that LP had signed with RedOne's record label, 2011 Records. LP landed her first major breakthrough as a songwriter, co-writing Rihanna's song, "Cheers (Drink to That)", featured on Rihanna's fifth studio album Loud, released on November 12, 2010, on Def Jam Recordings. "Cheers" features a vocal hook performed by LP (taken from Avril Lavigne's "I'm with You"). In a 2010 interview with MTV News, Rihanna said: "I love that song ("Cheers"). That is one of my favorite songs on the album. It makes you feel like celebrating. It gives you a great feeling inside like you want to go out and have a drink. ... People can't wait for the weekend." LP's major label songwriting breakthroughs continued, and she co-wrote "Beautiful People", performed by Christina Aguilera. The song is featured on the Burlesque: Original Motion Picture Soundtrack album, which was released on November 22, 2010, through RCA Records.

In June 2011, LP co-wrote "Afraid to Sleep", which was performed by NBC's The Voice finalist Vicci Martinez and reached #10 on the iTunes Top Singles Chart. In September 2011, LP signed a deal with Warner Bros. Records. Shortly after, "Into the Wild", written and performed by LP, was prominently used in a Citibank national television advertisement campaign. In April 2012, LP released her first major label album, Into the Wild: Live at EastWest Studios, a five-song live extended play, and started touring extensively including festivals such as SXSW, Bonnaroo, Lollapalooza, Bumbershoot, Tropfest as well as Tokyo's Sonic Boom and London's Hyde Park. In 2012, LP became the first female Martin Guitar ambassador.

2013–2017

In May 2012, LP was featured as the Artist of the Week in Vogue magazine. Over the following two years, she completed the recording of their album that included collaborations with Billy Steinberg, Isabella "Machine" Summers (from Florence and the Machine), Josh Alexander, Claude Kelly, Justyn Pilbrow, Carl Ryden and Rob Kleiner. The album was produced by Rob Cavallo, Warner Bros. Records' chairman and producer. On April 1, 2014, it was announced that LP's third full-length studio album would be titled Forever for Now and was scheduled to be released on June 3, 2014. The album was promoted by the lead single "Night Like This". Following the album, a second single, "Someday", was released in June 2014 in Canada. On September 16, 2014, a music video for "Tokyo Sunrise" officially premiered on Time magazine's website.

In September 2015, the song "Muddy Waters" was released as the first single from LP's fourth studio album Lost on You. In November 2015 one of LP's best known songs, "Lost on You" was released to great success.

In June 2016, "Muddy Waters" featured in the closing scene of the season four finale of Netflix's original series Orange Is the New Black. It was also featured in the trailer for the NBC show Shades of Blue. "Muddy Waters" clarifies the ending of season 5, episode 4 of Starz Power. In November, the album's eponymous second single was released, while LP held a residency at the No Vacancy club. Both songs originate from a collaboration with Mike Del Rio. An EP titled Death Valley was released on June 17, 2016.

The song "Hi Ho Nobody Home" by David Baerwald featuring LP was used in an episode of Mr. Mercedes.
In 2017 LP performed the song "Back Where I Belong" (Otto Knows featuring Avicii) for episode 5 of season 2 of Netflix's original series Sense8.

LP duets with Mylène Farmer on the single , released on June 22. The single immediately hit number 1 on the French iTunes chart upon release. The track is the second single from Farmer's upcoming studio album, .

2018–present 
On June 15, 2018, LP announced on her Facebook page that she had been working on a new album.  A day later, the first track from the record, "Girls Go Wild" was released. 'Recovery' was released later. A Genius annotation for 'Girls Go Wild' was released on the 17 August 2018.

In September 2018, LP recorded two songs for the singer Morrissey for his new album of cover songs.

In October 2019, the song "Strange" was featured on the commercial for the Samsung Galaxy phone.

In June 2019, LP gave an exclusive interview to ÖMC Dergi (Dergi), Turkey's biggest digital music magazine, as part of the promotion of the new album Heart to Mouth, and became the cover star of a magazine for the first time in Turkey. LP performed three big concerts in Istanbul, İzmir, Ankara, respectively, in Turkey after giving an interview to the magazine. 

Sharing the cover photo of ÖMC Dergi, which introduced their album for the first time and gave an interview, LP posted on all her social media accounts, "Interview + Cover Artist for June!! Ankara - See you Soon!" The director and photographer Darren Craig took the photoshoot for the ÖMC Dergi - June 2019 issue of the LP.

"How Low Can You Go" and "The One That You Love" were released in 2020. "One Last Time", "Goodbye", and "Angles" were released in 2021. All five songs were released as singles for the album Churches, which was released on December 3 that year.

In 2021, LP also released the song "Fighter" with Imanbek.

October 2022- LP was featured on the song 'Line It Up' released by American band Palaye Royale in their new album Fever Dream.

Personal life
LP identifies as a lesbian, and said in a 2016 interview: "It's not important to prove myself as a lesbian. But nevertheless visibility is important. We are normal people just like anybody else."

LP wrote the song "Lost on You" after her breakup with actress Tamzin Brown, and was in a relationship with American singer-songwriter Lauren Ruth Ward, who appears in the music video. LP also dated Mexican actress Julieta Grajales: their relationship ended in 2022.

LP identifies as gender-neutral, stating in an interview: "I go by 'she' and 'her', but I honestly don't love it. But it would take me out of my life too much to insist on 'they'. But I respect people doing it." She also stated she is "equally comfortable" being considered a "garden variety lesbian woman." As of 2022, LP's official bio uses 'she' pronouns.

Discography

Studio albums

Live albums

Extended plays

Singles

Other charted songs

Music videos

Songwriting credits

Awards and nominations

Footnotes

References

External links
 
 LP discography at Discogs

1981 births
Living people
20th-century American LGBT people
21st-century American guitarists
21st-century American singers
21st-century American women guitarists
21st-century American women singers
21st-century American women writers
21st-century LGBT people
American lesbian musicians
American rock songwriters
American women rock singers
American women singer-songwriters
American people of Irish descent
American people of Italian descent
American LGBT singers
Guitarists from New York (state)
LGBT people from New York (state)
Singer-songwriters from New York (state)
People from Long Island
People of Campanian descent
People of Sicilian descent